"The Lyin', the Watch and the Wardrobe" is an episode from the dramedy series Ugly Betty, which aired on October 26, 2006. Internationally, it is the sixth episode overall, but in the United States and Australia it aired as the fifth due to the delayed airing of "Swag." The episode name is a play on words of the novel and subsequent film titled The Lion, the Witch and the Wardrobe in the Chronicles of Narnia series, which incidentally was produced by The Walt Disney Company, the parent company of Ugly Bettys co-producers, ABC Studios.

Plot

On Halloween day, Betty shows up to work dressed like a butterfly for a supposed costume party, only to discover that she had been tricked by a prank e-mail sent by Marc. Betty is about to have her work cut out for her when Daniel asks her to track down his lost watch, which he left at a girlfriend's place, but he cannot remember which one. He tells Betty to get Amanda to help her, but it appears that Amanda may be holding back in a jealous fit, for it turns out that she has the watch. Betty finally puts two and two together, and confronts Amanda in the bathroom. Amanda reveals to Betty that she always wanted Daniel for herself but she is tired of his constant one-night stands with other women and admits her hope that he will pick her, knowing it will never happen. Having got this off her chest, Amanda pulls herself together, and tells Betty to forget what she just said. She gives the watch to Betty, who in turn passes it back to Daniel.

In between the melee, Betty finds herself smitten by Henry from accounting, who has come down to chat to Betty. Earlier in the day, Walter gave Betty a gift of a hollow pumpkin with candy in the middle. He told Betty to eat the candy in the pumpkin until she finds her gift. The gift is the key to Walter's apartment, with a note asking her to move in with him. With so many things distracting her, Betty has no time to give Walter an answer but does find time to have lunch with Henry after he invites her to the Sushi bar across the street. When Walter turns up at Betty's work and asks where she is, Amanda tells him. Walter arrives just as Henry is about to let Betty taste the sushi, confronts the two and walks off. In the end, Betty tells Henry that she wants to work things out with Walter. She does just that, with Walter nixing the living arrangements and agreeing to continue dating for now.

Daniel visits his mother Claire, who has been in a rehab clinic for over a month for her drinking problems as a result of her troubled marriage to Bradford after his admitted affair with Fey. While Daniel asks his mother about the music box and the night she burned the magazines, Claire asks her reluctant son to take her out for lunch at a restaurant. During the lunch conversation, Claire tells Daniel that the affair between Bradford and Fey had been going on for twenty years. When she and Fey went to confront Bradford in his office to make him choose, Fey ended up dead and Claire ended up in rehab. Later that day, Daniel confronts Bradford about the affair. Bradford says that he did not want to hurt Daniel or Claire and regrets making that mistake. Daniel discloses to Bradford his knowledge of the burned glasses and license plate from Fey's music box (which Bradford had hidden away to cover his tracks, but lost). Bradford had told Steve to seek out the person who has been leaking the info to Daniel with the aim of having his son turn against him. After leaving the office, Daniel is left confused. Amanda runs into him in the lift and suggests seeing him that night, even just to chat. Daniel is too distracted, wants to be alone, and turns down her offer.

Meanwhile, Wilhelmina's plan for a date with a younger man takes a turn for the worse when she is called a cradle robber on Fashion TV, so she makes Marc find a replacement date that she can take to a major event and gets Christina to create a dress for her. When Wilhelmina attempts to try it on she is horrified to learn that she cannot fit into the size-2 designer gown, with Christina blurting out that Wilhelmina has gained weight. Wilhelmina decides to shed some pounds, using steam and diet, which helps as Christina finally gives her a dress that fits better and just in time to take the same young guy out to the event until her daughter Nico shows up. Later, Wilhelmina talks to the mystery woman about what happened between Daniel and Bradford, which prompts the semi-bandaged person to make plans for the return of Fey Sommers.

As Halloween comes to a close, Betty confronts Ignacio over his false Social Security card. Ignacio admits to Betty that he came to the United States illegally, leaving Betty shocked and stunned by his confession.

Also starring
Michael Urie - Marc St. James  
Kevin Sussman - Walter
Christopher Gorham - Henry Grubstick
Judith Light - Claire Meade
Elizabeth Payne - Masked Woman
Stelio Savante - Steve
Jowharah Jones - Nico Slater

Guest stars
Patrick Fabian - Fashion TV Anchor
Alison McAtee - Friday Night
Tasha Taylor - Thursday Night
Jean-Christophe Febbrari - Waiter
Amanda Lockwood - Mode Girl
Jesse Marchant - Jason
Jeanne Simpson - Receptionist

Production
During the scene in the bathroom with Amanda, Betty's costumed wings are reversed. The reason for that was the camera is looking at Betty through the mirror.

This is the only episode whose "Ugly Betty" opening intro following Marc's "Betty" getup featured the festive Halloween colors instead of the usual yellow background with the red "Ugly Betty" title fonts.

This is the first episode in which Claire Meade (Judith Light) appears. Producer Silvio Horta, who had been an admirer of Light, originally worked with her on a proposed TV pilot prior to "Ugly Betty" but it was rejected.

Reception
In a review from Entertainment Weekly, Michael Sleazak writes, "On paper, the decision of Ugly Betty's writing staff to turn its Halloween episode into an examination of its characters' various disguises sounds like an obvious exercise. And yet, as last night's typically mesmerizing hour reminded us, it's foolish to make snap judgments about anything (or anyone) in the Betty universe."

Awards
This episode was submitted for consideration in the category of "Outstanding Writing for a Comedy Series" for the 2007 Emmy Awards. Tony Plana also submitted this episode for consideration of his work in the category of "Outstanding Supporting Actor in a Comedy Series".

References

Ugly Betty (season 1) episodes
2006 American television episodes
Halloween television episodes